Honduras competed at the 2014 Summer Youth Olympics, in Nanjing, China from 16 August to 28 August 2014.

Football

Honduras will compete in the boys' tournament.

Boys' Tournament

Roster

 Elin Agurcia Avila
 Denilson Almendarez Sauceda
 Joel Banegas Saravia
 Paolo Belloni Urso
 Jose Caballero Cortez
 Wesly Decas
 Darwin Diego Mejia
 Anderson Flores Lozano
 Alex Laureano Archaga
 Allan Martinez Reyes
 Kevin Paz Pineda
 Oscar Reyes Puerto
 Ojeyel Ruiz Suazo
 Mikel Santos Castillo
 Dayron Suazo Arzu
 Javier Umana Granados
 Jairo Umanzor Garcia
 Jose Vasquez Ortiz

Group Stage

Fifth place match

Swimming

Honduras qualified two swimmers.

Boys

Girls

Wrestling

Honduras was given a spot to compete from the Tripartite Commission.

Boys

References

2014 in Honduran sport
Nations at the 2014 Summer Youth Olympics
Honduras at the Youth Olympics